Like all other historical urban centres, the capital city of Malaysia, Kuala Lumpur, contains a number of current and old roads and streets across the city.

This article contains an alphabetical list of notable roads within Kuala Lumpur.

Overview
The names of the majority of older roads in and around Kuala Lumpur were originally formed during British rule in Selangor, and as such, were in English and named after British figures, a handful of local dignitaries or royalties, districts, local populations, landmarks or geographical features. Other surrounding locales, such as Kampung Baru, Pudu, Imbi and Sentul have had roads known primarily in Malay since colonial rule.

Following Malaya's independence in 1957 and the formation of Malaysia in 1963, street names in Kuala Lumpur were translated into the Malay language, some of which were given more simplified descriptions (i.e. "Old Market Square" as "Medan Pasar Besar" and "Foch Avenue" as "Jalan Foch"), as Malay was officially adopted as the official language of Malaysia in 1967.

The vast majority of the street names was further renamed en masse in 1981, as part of post-independence decolonisation pushed by the then newly elected Prime Minister of Malaysia Mahathir Mohamad. Street names which previously featured semblances of English origins were replaced by those commemorating local Malay figures, Malay culture and key politicians in Malaya/Malaysia. The renaming included roads in the core of old Kuala Lumpur, as well as major thoroughfares in the city. Further renaming of old street names persists to date, with the rounds of revision conducted by the Kuala Lumpur City Hall as late as 2007 on streets in Pudu and in the fringe towns of Sungai Besi and Jinjang, where English and British-named street names were still in use. Minor roads, however, are typically spared from this form of renaming.

The accelerated development of the city after the country's independence also contributed to the widening of existing artery routes, creation of highways and new roadways, and extensive grade separation of roadways. This resulted in significant alterations of roadways in the city, with several roads merged, split, or modified, forming new roads or retiring old ones.

Criticism
While earlier street name changes post-independence have been generally accepted, the persistent renaming campaign of existing roads and growing public awareness of the history of Kuala Lumpur's streets has increasingly drawn ire from local communities, particularly road users, postal users, and historians, due to inconvenience borne from memorising longer, more convoluted names of roads which were formerly shorter and easier to memorise, the increased cost of replacing and maintaining documents and signages, and the revisionist undertones of the renaming policy. One renaming campaign of eight major roads in honour of former Yang di-Pertuan Agongs on 2 November]] 2014 had notably drawn backlash from the public as well as Member of Parliament Lim Lip Eng, leading to a rebuttal by UMNO Youth chief Khairy Jamaluddin; the name change proceeded in spite of the controversy.

Standard translations
A guideline was formulated for the translation of English signage on roads. The Kuala Lumpur City Hall is pursuing a process of standardisation for road signage. (e.g. Tengkat Tong Shin has been renamed as Jalan Tong Shin)

Circular - PekelilingDrive – Persiaran (e.g. Hampshire Drive/Persiaran Hampshire)
Gardens – Taman (e.g. Maxwell Garden/Taman Maxwell; Happy Garden/"Taman Bahagia")
Lane – Lorong (e.g. Horse Lane/Lorong Kuda)
Road – Jalan (e.g. Perak Road/Jalan Perak)
Ring Road - Lingkaran (e.g. Lingkaran Syed Putra)
Square – Medan (e.g. Old Market Square/Medan Pasar Lama)
Street – Lebuh (e.g. Menjalara Street/Lebuh Menjalara'')

Major roads

Other notable roads

See also
 Street names of George Town, Penang
 List of roads in Ipoh
 List of old and new road names in Taiping

References

 Larry Lam's Guide Note: Old Names of Roads in KL
 Kuala Lumpur road map, circa 1960
 Mariana Isa & Maganjeet Kaur (2015), Kuala Lumpur Street Names, Marshall Cavendish: Singapore. 

Kuala Lumpur